H19 is a regional road (H-Highway) in Crimea and Sevastopol, Ukraine. It is a western part of the so-called Yuzhnoberezhne shose (South-coastal highway). It runs east-west and connects Yalta with Sevastopol. Since the 2014, annexation of Crimea by the Russian Federation, the route was given another code 35K-002 and 67K-1 (within Sevastopol).

Main route

Main route and connections to/intersections with other highways in Ukraine.

See also

 Roads in Ukraine

References

External links
Regional Roads in Ukraine in Russian

Roads in Crimea
Roads in Sevastopol
Transport in Yalta